Forum de Valencia is an indoor sporting arena located in the Venezuelan city of Valencia, Carabobo. The capacity of the arena is 10,000 and is used mostly for basketball and concerts.

Indoor arenas in Venezuela
Buildings and structures in Valencia, Venezuela
Basketball venues in Venezuela
Forum